Yusupovo (Yosop) is a rural locality (a selo) in Cherlakovsky Selsoviet, Dyurtyulinsky District, Bashkortostan, Russia. The population was 668 as of 2010. There are 9 streets.

Geography 
Yusupovo is located 35 km northwest of Dyurtyuli (the district's administrative centre) by road. Novy Burtyuk is the nearest rural locality.

References 

Rural localities in Dyurtyulinsky District